Phil Ford (June 21, 1919 – June 15, 2005) was a vaudeville performer, musician, and comedian, whose career spanned over seven decades.

Life and career

Ford was born in San Francisco, California on June 21, 1919. He started in show business at the age of 12 and joined the Army during World War II. 

He met his future wife, singer and dancer Mimi Hines in 1952 and they married two years later.

In 1958, they appeared on Jack Paar's Tonight Show, which helped launch their careers. They also appeared as guests on the shows of Johnny Carson, Ed Sullivan, Dean Martin, Bobby Darin, Mike Douglas and Merv Griffin. They appeared in one film together, Saturday Night in Apple Valley in 1965.

When Hines replaced Barbra Streisand as Fanny Brice in the hit musical "Funny Girl" in 1965, Ford was given the part of Eddie.

Hines and Ford divorced in 1972 but worked together professionally several times after their divorce.

Ford died of natural causes on June 15, 2005 in Las Vegas.

References

1919 births
2005 deaths
20th-century American singers